Vanoli is a surname. Notable people with the surname include:

 Alejandro Vanoli (born 1961), proposed president of the Central Bank of Argentina
 Paolo Vanoli (born 1972), retired Italian football player
 Rodolfo Vanoli (born 1963), retired Italian football player

Italian-language surnames